Better Than Us (literally Better than Humans) is a 2018 Russian science fiction television series created by Andrey Junkovsky, about an advanced empathic android named Arisa. It stars Paulina Andreeva and Kirill Käro, as well as Aleksandr Ustyugov. It was produced by Yellow, Black and White in cooperation with Sputnik Vostok Production for the Russian state channel C1R.

Netflix purchased it under the English title Better than Us, and it is the first Russian series presented as a Netflix original series. On 16 August 2019, the first season of sixteen episodes became available to stream in Netflix markets outside of Russia and China. A second season of ten episodes is planned to begin filming in Moscow and Beijing in the third quarter of 2021.

Synopsis
The story takes place in 2029, in a world where androids serve humans in various positions, even replacing them in many menial jobs. An advanced robot named Arisa is imported to Russia from China discreetly, within the CRONOS corporation. Arisa accidentally kills a man who tries to use her as a sex robot, and then flees. Her ability to kill humans shows she does not abide by Asimov's Three Laws of Robotics. Instead, she is designed to protect her family (which includes herself) by all means possible. She encounters a little girl (Sonia) and automatically bonds with her, making herself the child's guardian.

The series follows three storylines:

 that of Arisa and the family she adopts; 
 the family's son, Egor Safronov, and his girlfriend, Zhanna, as part of the anti-droid militant group called the "Liquidators"; 
 the secrets of Viktor Toropov, the head of CRONOS, as he tries to hide the fact that they are unable to make another Arisa.

By the end, it is revealed that China's one-child policy has led to a critical shortage of marriageable women, so an engineer designed Arisa; she is programmed to be a wife to a man and mother to adopted children. However, her creator dies and Arisa is sold to the Russian robotics firm CRONOS.

Cast and characters

 Paulina Andreeva as Arisa, prototype of a new generation of empathetic bots
 Kirill Käro as Georgy Safronov, pathologist, former surgeon, father to Egor and Sonya
 Aleksandr Ustyugov as Viktor Toropov, CRONOS director

Family
 Olga Lomonosova as Alla Safronova, Georgy's ex-wife
 Eldar Kalimulin as Egor Safronov, Georgy and Alla's son
 Vita Kornienko as Sonya Safronova, Georgy and Alla's daughter

CRONOS, Liquidators, and related
 Aleksandr Kuznetsov as Bars, bartender at Club Liquidators and Zhanna's brother
 Vera Panfilova as Zhanna Barseneva, waitress at Bot.Net and Bars' sister
 Fedor Lavrov as Gleb, a fixer on Toropov's payroll (CRONOS) and liaison to the Liquidators
 Sergey Sosnovsky as Alexey Stepanovich Losev, head of the State Duma Committee on Cyber Security and Svetlana's father
 Pavel Vorozhtsov as Igor Mikhailovich Maslovsky, head tech at CRONOS
 Irina Tarannik as Svetlana Toropova, Viktor's wife
 Mariya Lugovaya as Larisa 'Lara' Kuras, a hacker helping the Liquidators, who is involved with Bars

Police
 Sergey Kolesnikov as Anatoly Vladimirovich Svetov, head of the police department on fighting cybercrime
 Kirill Polukhin as Pavel Borisovich Varlamov, an investigator in the cybercrime department, a former employee of the homicide department
 Viktoriya Korlyakova as Irina Plescheeva, a subordinate to Varlamov in the cybercrime department

Production
The filming of the television series began in 2016 and ended in 2018.

See also
 Real Humans, 2012 Swedish television series
 Almost Human, 2013 American television series
 Humans, 2015 British-American television series

References

External links
 
 Better than Us on Netflix

Androids in television
2018 Russian television series debuts
2010s Russian television series
Russian-language Netflix original programming
Existentialist television series
Hard science fiction
Philosophical fiction
Robots in television
Serial drama television series
Television shows filmed in Moscow
Transhumanism in television series
Channel One Russia original programming
Russian drama television series
Russian science fiction television series
Works set in Moscow
Science fiction web series
2018 web series debuts